The Zollinger-Harned Company Building, now known as The Sovereign Building, is an historic department store building, which is located in Allentown, Lehigh County, Pennsylvania.

History
Allentown's third department store, Zollinger-Harned, has its origins in the dry goods firm of Lawfer & Steckel, founded by William R. Lawfer and W. R. Steckel in 1866 at 626 Hamilton Street (Corner of Church & Hamilton Streets). The store carried a large stock of dry goods, notions and groceries.

The business was continued by the original partners until 1874, when Steckel disposed of his interest to George W. Hartzell. Hartzell retired in 1876 and the firm was re-constituted as W.R. Lawfer & Company.

W.R. Lawfer expanded the business and purchased the larger buildings at 611 and 613 Hamilton Street.  He combined the structures into one large building which opened in March, 1882. The firm sold a wide number of women's dresses, and coats. As the firm grew it expanded with books,  toys, jewellery, kitchen crockery, carpets as well as men's and children's clothing.

To accommodate this expansion,  W.R. Lawfer expanded the store by first purchasing two properties at 12 and 16 North Sixth Street. All of these buildings were merged, forming an "T" shape, with the Hamilton Street buildings extending north to Court Street, the Sixth Street buildings merging into the Hamilton Street building on the right side of the property. The present-day Sovereign Building retains this basic design. A second expansion added the stores at 607 and 609 Hamilton Street to the store, with Lawfer advertising the store as "Allentown's Big Department Store".

Lawfer and John Wanamaker of Philadelphia were friends, as Lawfer had worked for Wanamaker in the 1850s and 1860s prior to opening his own store in Allentown. It was from Wanamaker's Department store that Lawfer began decorating his store, as early as 1904 at Christmas. Lawfer's was the first local department store to feature a separate toy department that it called “Toyland.” At the center of the toy display that Christmas was a twenty-four-foot-tall, one-ton figure it called “Santa Claus’ Father.” It is not known if this was an attempt to combine the English figure known as “Father Christmas” with Nast's character. On December 9, 1905 local newspapers ran the first announcement of Lawfer's live Santa Claus. “Visit Santa Claus at his Cave in Toyland,” it read. “If you haven’t paid Santa a visit in his pretty Toyland, you had better come soon. Santa remembers every little face, you know, and he says there are some chubby little folks on his list he hasn’t seen yet. Bring your letters and put them in the letter box in his cave.”

W. R. Lawfer died suddenly on September 11, 1900 and the store was taken over by his sons, J. Harry Lrawfer, John N. Lawfer, and Alvin W. Lawfer. They ran the business for the next several years until 1903 when J. Harry Lawfer retired from the firm, turning his share of the business to John N. Lawfer.  John N Lawfer subsequently sold his share to Alvan Lawfer and he started his own carpet and drapery store at 709 Hamilton Street. In 1906, due to ill health, Alvin Lawfer sold a major interest in the store to Clarence J. Early, and the name was changed to Lawfer-Early. However, the following year, in 1907, with his health further failing Lawfer sold his interests to William C. Harned and the ownership was totally reorganized and the name changed to Harned-Early. In a further reorganization in 1909, William R. Zollinger purchased Early's interests with the store again being renamed the Zollinger-Harned Company.  William Zollinger, who lived in Sandusky, Ohio, operated the Zollinger Department store the 1880s. The new owners tore down the amalgamation of separate storefronts and erected a single large three-story building at 607-613 Hamilton that wrapped around to the right with a double storefront at 14 to 16 North Sixth Street.

In 1922, William Zollinger died, and his interests were purchased by the Vollmer family. In 1926, the store expanded again by purchasing 605 Hamilton Street, which it incorporated into its existing building. As part of the expansion, the store was remodeled into a seven bay wide building with Classical Revival style influences. It featured architectural terra cotta panels and richly detailed bronze display window surrounds. This remodeling was completed in 1926.

The store operated successfully for decades, and was the first of the Allentown department stores to open a branch at the suburban Whitehall Mall in 1966. In 1970, Donald Vollmer, then president of the store, purchased Bears Department Store in York, Pennsylvania and renamed it Zollinger-Harned, making it the third store in the then Zollinger-Harned chain. A fourth store in the Wyoming Valley Mall near Wilkes-Barre was opened in 1971.

However, like many other major department stores in the 1970s, suburbanization and the growth of shopping malls led to declining sales of large department stores in Central Business Districts. In 1975, Zollinger's was still profitable, but in 1976 the losses began to mount. In February 1977, Vollmer sold his interest to Allentown clothier Sigmund Levin for $1 and other considerations. A month later, Levin filed for Chapter 13 bankruptcy protection from creditors while the company reorganized. Over the next 11 months, the company went through a variety of efforts to return to financial health.

The slide continued, however. A few months after the petition was filed, the company abandoned its York store and its merchandise was eventually sold and the store closed. In October 1977, the Wyoming Valley Mall store was sold to Hess's. Lastly, the Allentown flagship and the Whitehall Mall stores lasted through the Christmas shopping season of 1977. However, Zollinger-Harned filed for complete bankruptcy on January 30, 1978, and closed its doors for the last time.

Sovereign Building

The Whitehall Mall store was sold to Leh's. However, for several years the flagship store on Hamilton Street in Allentown remained vacant. It was added to the National Register of Historic Places in 1979. In December 1982, the Allentown store was purchased by Sovereign Realty and Development. The building was renovated and reopened as the Sovereign Building in May 1984. Renovations included a glass-arched entrance from a pedestrian plaza between Hamilton and Court streets leading to a "grapefruit-domed" lobby with a decor of antique brass, mirrors, greenery and wing-backed chairs. The main floor and basement were developed into retail spaces, while the upper floors were turned into forty-two private office suites.

Sovereign later went into financial difficulties and the building was sold at a sheriff's sale on September 22, 1989. Today the building is operated as an office building by an owner who resides in Philadelphia.

See also
 H. Leh and Company
 Hess Brothers
 List of historic places in Allentown, Pennsylvania

References

External links

Commercial buildings on the National Register of Historic Places in Pennsylvania
Neoclassical architecture in Pennsylvania
Commercial buildings completed in 1926
History of Allentown, Pennsylvania
Buildings and structures in Allentown, Pennsylvania
Department stores on the National Register of Historic Places
National Register of Historic Places in Lehigh County, Pennsylvania